Putri Syaikah Ulima Hidayat (born 1 September 2001) is an Indonesian badminton player affiliated with Exist Jakarta club. She was part of the national junior team that won the first Suhandinata Cup for Indonesia in 2019 BWF World Junior Championships.

Achievements

BWF World Tour (1 runner-up) 
The BWF World Tour, which was announced on 19 March 2017 and implemented in 2018, is a series of elite badminton tournaments sanctioned by the Badminton World Federation (BWF). The BWF World Tours are divided into levels of World Tour Finals, Super 1000, Super 750, Super 500, Super 300 (part of the HSBC World Tour), and the BWF Tour Super 100.

Women's doubles

BWF International Challenge/Series (3 titles) 
Women's doubles

  BWF International Challenge tournament
  BWF International Series tournament

BWF Junior International (1 title, 2 runners-up) 

Girls' doubles

  BWF Junior International Grand Prix tournament
  BWF Junior International Challenge tournament
  BWF Junior International Series tournament
  BWF Junior Future Series tournament

Performance timeline

National team 
 Junior level

 Senior level

Individual competitions

Junior level

Senior level

Women's doubles

References 

Living people
2001 births
People from Padang
Sportspeople from West Sumatra
Indonesian female badminton players
21st-century Indonesian women